Too Slim and the Taildraggers is an American blues rock band formed in 1986 in Spokane, Washington, United States. The band has had six albums peak in the top 10 of the Billboard Top Blues Albums. Members currently consist of Tim "Too Slim" Langford (lead vocals, guitar), Robert Kearnes (bass, vocals) and Jeffrey "Shakey" Fowlkes (drums). The band is located in Nashville, Tennessee, United States. 

To date, Too Slim and the Taildraggers have released 14 studio albums and five live albums. The Fortune Teller (2007), Free Your Mind (2009), Shiver (2011), Blue Heart (2013), and Blood Moon (2016) all charted in the Top 10 of the Billboard Top Blues Albums, peaking at numbers 9, 5, 9, 3, and 6 respectively.

Awards
The Inland Empire Blues Society named the band "Best Blues Band" for four consecutive years, from 1995-1998, while the albums Swamp Opera and Blues for EB were also named Best Albums. The Cascade Blues Association named them "Best Regional Band" for 11 consecutive years, 1995-1999.

Washington State Blues Society awarded Too Slim and the Taildraggers the Lifetime Achievement Award in 2012; Shiver was nominated for the category Rock Blues Album at the Blues Music Awards in the same year.

Membership

Current members

Past members

Discography

Studio albums

Live albums

Compilation albums

References

External links
 
 

American blues musical groups
Musical groups from Washington (state)
Musical groups established in 1986
1986 establishments in Washington (state)
Alternative rock groups from Washington (state)
Musical groups from Spokane